Sociedad Deportiva Almazán is a Spanish football team based in Almazán, Soria, in the autonomous community of Castile and León. Founded in 1967 it plays in Tercera División RFEF – Group 8, holding home matches at Estadio La Arboleda, with a capacity of 2,000 seats.

Season to season

34 seasons in Tercera División
1 season in Tercera División RFEF

References

External links
 
 SD Almazán on Instagram

Football clubs in Castile and León
Association football clubs established in 1967
1967 establishments in Spain
Province of Soria